The pestle-tailed worm lizard (Dalophia pistillum) is a species of amphisbaenian in the family Amphisbaenidae. The species indigenous to southern Africa.

References

External link
 Worm Lizards of South Africa

Dalophia
Reptiles described in 1895
Taxa named by Oskar Boettger